Sarabotys cupreicostalis is a moth in the family Crambidae. It is found in Mexico (Guerrero, Puebla, Jalisco, Chiapas, Sonora) and Venezuela.

The wingspan is 21–27 mm for males and about 25 mm for females. The wings are pale yellow, somewhat lustrous and subhyaline. The markings are brownish. Adults are on wing from May to October.

References

Moths described in 1913
Pyraustinae